Villanueva is an unincorporated community and census-designated place in San Miguel County, New Mexico, United States. Known as La Cuesta until 1890, it is located along the Pecos River and New Mexico State Road 3.  Villanueva has the ZIP code 87583. The 87583 ZIP Code Tabulation Area had a population of 234 in the 2010 United States census, compared to 267 in 2000. A total of 211 residents of Villanueva in 2010 identified themselves as Hispanic.

Demographics

History

Prior to 1786, when a peace treaty was concluded with the Comanche, Spanish settlements in New Mexico were confined to the Rio Grande valley.  The reduced threat from Comanche raids permitted the expansion eastwards of Spanish settlements onto the Great Plains. Villanueva was one of the settlements founded in the Pecos River Valley as part of that expansion. A principal reason for founding the Pecos Valley settlements was to defend the Spanish and Pueblan settlements in the Rio Grande valley from raids by Apache and other Indian peoples.

Villanueva, a Spanish colonial village, was founded in 1808 and originally called La Cuesta (Spanish, hill or slope) because the village sits on top of a steeply sloping hill or cuesta overlooking the Pecos River.  La Cuesta was one of the communities located within the San Miguel del Vado Land Grant. The grant was approved by the Spanish government in 1794 and settlements established in the land grant area included Bernal, El Pueblo, Entrnosa, Guzano, La Cuesta, Las Mulas, Puertecito, San Jose del Vado, and San Miguel del Vado.

A church, still existing, was built in La Cuesta in 1831. By 1835 and thereafter, La Cuesta was one of the most populous settlements in the Pecos Valley. In 1845 La Cuesta probably had a population approaching 500 people.

Many Ciboleros (buffalo hunters) and Comancheros (traders with the Plains Indians), of the 19th century originated from La Cuesta and other Hispano communities along the Pecos River.

In 1890, the community was renamed to Villanueva, for a prominent local family.

Climate
Villanueva has a BWk (Semi-arid cold steppe climate) under the Köppen climate classification system. Under the Trewartha climate classification Villanueva has a BSK (Semi-arid steppe with hot summers and cool winters). 

Area attractions

East of Villanueva is Villanueva State Park, a colorful canyon cut by the Pecos River.

Education
It is in the West Las Vegas Schools school district. West Las Vegas High School is the area high school.

References

Further reading
 The Villanueva, New Mexico story; F. Stanley; 24 pages; 1970.

External links
 Villanueva community profile
 1870 Census of La Cuesta (Villanueva), page 1, page 2

Unincorporated communities in New Mexico
Unincorporated communities in San Miguel County, New Mexico